Kitui is a town and capital of Kitui County in Kenya, 180 kilometres east of Nairobi and 105 kilometres east of Machakos. it covers an area approximately 30,496.4 km squares and  lies between latitudes 0°10 South and 3°0 South and longitudes 37°50 East and 39°0 East. It borders seven counties i.e Machakos and Makueni counties to the west, Tana River County to the east and south-east, Taita Taveta County to the south, Embu to the north-west, and Tharaka-Nithi and Meru counties to the north. Kitui became the headquarters of Kitui County after the adoption of the new constitution and the devolved government.

Overview
The name Kitui means ‘a place where iron goods are made’. The Kamba iron-smiths who settled in the county many years before the colonial period are the ones who named the area Kitui.
Kitui had a population of 155,896 in 2009 making it the 12th largest urban centre in Kenya in terms of population. It is the largest urban centre in the county followed by Mwingi. A large majority of the residents belong to the Kamba, a Bantu people. The Kamba of Kenya speak the Bantu Kamba language (Kikamba) as a mother tongue. Kitui is also inhabited by several other Kenyan communities like the Luo, Somali, Kikuyu and people from the Coast Region.

Kitui is widely known in Kenya for producing a majority of the country's top legal minds. These include former Chief Justices Kitili Maluki Mwendwa (1968–1971) and Dr. Willy Mutunga (2011–2016), State University of New York (SUNY) Distinguished Professor Makau W. Mutua, and former Law Society of Kenya Chairman, Eric Mutua.

Kitui is also widely known in Kenya for its powerful traditional doctors and is therefore a key destination for those seeking these services.

Education
The major secondary schools around Kitui town are Kitui School, St. Charles Lwanga High School, Mulango Girls' High School, St. Angela's High School, St. Ursula Tungutu Girls Secondary School, Chuluni Girls' Secondary School, Matinyani Secondary School and St. Aquinas Kalawa Boys' Secondary School. The major public primary schools in Kitui town include Central Primary School, Muslim Primary School, Manyenyoni primary school, Kaveta Primary School, Kalawa Primary School, Ngiini Primary School, Kwa Ngindu Primary School among others. There are also several private schools in the Kitui town.

Higher education
Kitui County is home to several Universities and Colleges.
 South Eastern Kenya University (SEKU) – The University is a fully fledged University and is the successor to the South Eastern University College (SEUCO) which was a Constituent College of the University of Nairobi.The University is a premier institution of higher learning in the region offering various certificate, diploma and degree programmes. SEKU envisions becoming a World Class University with quality teaching, creative learning, innovative research and strong community outreach.
Kenya Medical Training College (KMTC)
Kenyatta University Kitui Campus

References

External links 
visitkitui.com
Information site created by volunteers working and living in Kitui, summer 2011 – "Help to Self-help in Africa" selvhjelpiafrika.org 
softkenya.com/town/kitui 
kitui.com

Populated places in Kitui County
Populated places in Eastern Province (Kenya)
County capitals in Kenya